Serra da Ribeirinha is a mountain in the Azores. It is located in Angra do Heroísmo, on the island of Terceira.

References

Angra do Heroísmo
Mountain ranges of Portugal